Egyptian Hieroglyph Format Controls is a Unicode block containing formatting characters that enable full formatting of quadrats for Egyptian hieroglyphs.

The block size was expanded by 32 code points in Unicode version 15.0 (version 14:  → version 15), and 29 more characters were defined.

Block

The Egyptian Hieroglyph Format Controls block has four variation sequences defined for standardized variants.

Variation selector-1 (VS1) (U+FE00) can be used to expand "lost" sign shading to achieve 'continuous shading' for the following characters:

History
The following Unicode-related documents record the purpose and process of defining specific characters in the Egyptian Hieroglyph Format Controls block:

See also 
 Egyptian Hieroglyphs (Unicode block)

References 

Unicode blocks